Chatham Hall is a grades 9-12 girls' boarding school in Chatham, Virginia, United States, founded in 1894 as Chatham Episcopal Institute. Tuition for the 2022-2023 school year is $25,725 (day students), $53,025 (5-day boarding), and $61,425 (7-day boarding). Nearly half of the student body receive financial aid, with the average award being $38,723.

Chatham Hall is accredited by the Virginia Association of Independent Schools, a member of the National Association for College Admission Counseling (NACAC), and in compliance with the NACAC's Principle of Good Practice.

Academics
Chatham Hall’s average class size is seven with a 5:1 student:teacher ratio. Curricular highlights include advanced courses, global programs, student-led workshops, January Term, robotics, and global entrepreneurism.

Campus life

In 2022-2023, 92% of Chatham Hall students live on campus. Boarding students live on-campus for five or seven days a week. There are a small number of day students as well.

In the afternoons, students participate in activities that include a competitive athletics program in the Blue Ridge Conference, Interscholastic Equestrian Association (IEA) team and campus riding program, performing arts, and more. Sports currently offered include basketball, cross-country, diving, field hockey, lacrosse, golf, riding, soccer, swimming, tennis, and volleyball.

Chatham Hall is well-known for its riding program and facilities, including the Mars Riding Arena and Hunter Trial Field. The campus is home to 30 horses, two additional teaching arenas, and riding trails.

Chatham Hall is an independent Episcopal school with chapel services twice a week and follows the precepts of the National Association of Episcopal Schools (NAES).

Chatham Hall's traditions include an honor code and longstanding yearly events.

Campus 
The Chatham Hall campus is 365 acres in Chatham, Virginia, United States located at 800 Chatham Hall Circle. Notable buildings include Pruden Hall, Dabney Hall, Curtis' Garden, Mars Riding Arena, and St. Mary’s Chapel.

Notable alumnae
 Claudia Emerson (1975) – Pulitzer-Prize winning poet
 Georgia O'Keeffe (1905) – artist
 Margaret Sullavan (1927) – Film star and Oscar nominee
 Ann Taylor (1954) – NPR broadcaster
 Maggie Taylor (1979) – artist

Miscellaneous
The film Crazy People (1990) was filmed at Chatham Hall.

Chatham Hall was briefly mentioned in the novel Betrayed.

References

External links
 School website

Boarding schools in Virginia
Preparatory schools in Virginia
Private high schools in Virginia
Independent School League
Educational institutions established in 1894
Schools in Pittsylvania County, Virginia
1894 establishments in Virginia
Episcopal schools in the United States